Russlirundhøe is a mountain in Vågå Municipality in Innlandet county, Norway. The mountain is surrounded by several other notable mountains including Hindnubben to the northeast, Stornubben to the north, Nautgardstinden to the west, and Besshø and Kollhøin to the southwest.

See also
List of mountains of Norway by height

References

Jotunheimen
Vågå
Mountains of Innlandet